Holmalunds IF is a Swedish football club located in Alingsås.

Background
Since their foundation in 1933 Holmalunds IF has participated mainly in the middle and lower divisions of the Swedish football league system.  The club currently plays in Division 3 Mellersta Götaland which is the fourth tier of Swedish football. They play their home matches at the Brogårdsvallen in Alingsås.

The team's colors are red and white and the team is sometimes called "Holmen". Holmalunds IF are affiliated to the Västergötlands Fotbollförbund.

Season to season

Current Squad for the 2011 Season

External links
 Holmalunds IF – Official Club Website
 Holmalunds IF – Official Men's Football Website

Footnotes

Football clubs in Västra Götaland County
Association football clubs established in 1933
1933 establishments in Sweden